The Don't Smile at Me Tour was the first headlining concert tour by American singer-songwriter Billie Eilish. It was launched in support of her debut EP Don't Smile at Me (2017), and consisted of 10 concerts in the United States and one in Canada. The tour was announced in July 2017, with dates being released at the same time. The set list featured all of the songs from Don't Smile at Me. The tour was positively received by critics.

Synopsis
Eilish would start the tour with  "Copycat" over flickering lights. They would slow the show and play "Idontwannabeyouanymore". "Watch" would then come next. She would then perform "Party Favor" while playing on a ukulele and would later transition into a cover of the Drake song "Hotline Bling". She would later perform an unreleased song called "Listen". Eilish ended her regular set with "Ocean Eyes". Eilish would return with a performance of "Bellyache" during the encore.

Set list 
This set list is representative of the show in Philadelphia, Pennsylvania on October 20, 2017. It is not representative of all concerts for the duration of the tour.

"Copycat" 
"Idontwannabeyouanymore"
"Watch" 
"Six Feet Under"
"Hotline Bling"
"Party Favor"
"I’m in Love Without You"
"Listen"
"Ocean Eyes"
"Wish You Were Gay"
"Bellyache"

Shows

References

Billie Eilish concert tours
2017 concert tours